The 2015 North Dakota Fighting Hawks football team represented the University of North Dakota during the 2015 NCAA Division I FCS football season. They were led by second year head coach Bubba Schweigert and played their home games at the Alerus Center.  The Fighting Hawks are a member of the Big Sky Conference.

Although playing most of the season without an official mascot, 2015 was North Dakota's first year with their new nickname as it was announced on November 18 that the university had adopted the Fighting Hawks after a public vote of students, faculty, staff and other members of the University of North Dakota community.

The Fighting Hawks finished the season 7–4, 5–3 in Big Sky play to finish in a four way tie for fourth place.

Previous season
In 2014, North Dakota finished with a record of 5–7, 3–5 in Big Sky play, to finish in a tie for eighth place. They failed to qualify for the FCS Playoffs.

Schedule

Game summaries

Wyoming

Drake

North Dakota State

UC Davis

Portland State

Idaho State

Weber State

Montana

Montana State

Northern Colorado

Cal Poly

Ranking movements

References

North Dakota
North Dakota Fighting Hawks football seasons
North Dakota Fighting Hawks football